The Irwin 25 is an American trailerable sailboat that was designed by Ted Irwin as a cruiser and first built in 1969.

Production
The design was built by Irwin Yachts in the United States from 1969 until 1976, but it is now out of production.

Design
The Irwin 25 is a recreational keelboat, built predominantly of fiberglass, with wood trim. It has a masthead sloop rig; a spooned, raked stem; a raised counter, plumb transom; an internally mounted spade-type rudder controlled by a tiller and a fixed fin keel with a retractable centerboard. A fixed fin keel model was also available. It displaces  and carries  of lead ballast.

The boat is normally fitted with a small  outboard motor, or an inboard motor for docking and maneuvering.

The design has sleeping accommodation for four to six people, with a double "V"-berth in the bow cabin, two straight settees in the main cabin, one of which can convert to a double with the drop-down dinette table, and an aft quarter berth on the port side. The galley is located on the starboard side abeam the companionway ladder. The galley is equipped with a fold-down two-burner stove, an icebox and a sink. The enclosed head is located just aft of the bow cabin on the port side. The fresh water tank has a capacity of 

Operational history
The boat is supported by an active class club, the Irwin Yacht Owners.

In a 2010 review Steve Henkel wrote, "Ted Irwin grew up in St. Petersburg, FL, and as a kid sailed boats in Tampa Bay. As a young man, he worked briefly in the plant of Charlie Morgan's Morgan Yacht Corp. That experience may have rubbed off a bit on the design of his Irwin 25 (introduced in 1968), which to a great extent resembles the Morgan 24/25 ... introduced in 1965. Both boats were popular club racers in the later 1960s and 1970s, but somehow the Morgan usually had the edge. The Irwin has the same displacement but a bit more ballast, a foot shorter waterline but a longer LOD as her overhangs are not as chopped off as the Morgan's; she has many similarities below the waterline, including a high aspect ratio centerboard ... her headroom gains an inch due to her doghouse, and her PHRF is a scant three seconds per mile higher. She was available as a keel/centerboarder ... or with a full keel (4' 0" draft, 1825 lbs. ballast). She had a choice of layouts: settee berths and a portside quarter berth ... or a dinette arrangement. Best features: None notable. Worst features: Centerboards and pendants on these boats are prone to problems,"

See also
List of sailing boat types

References

External links
Photo of an Irwin 25
Photo of an Irwin 25

Keelboats
1960s sailboat type designs
Sailing yachts
Trailer sailers
Sailboat type designs by Ted Irwin
Sailboat types built by Irwin Yachts